

Events 
 By place 
 Greece 
 After checking the ambitions of the Spartan tyrant, Nabis, the Roman forces under pro-consul Titus Quinctius Flamininus finally withdraw from Greece.
 With the Roman legions under Flaminius returning to Italy, the Greek states are once again on their own. The Romans leave the dominant powers in the region; the kingdom of Macedonia, the Aetolians, the strengthened Achaean League and the weakened Sparta. The Aetolians, who have opposed the Roman intervention in Greek affairs, incite the Spartan leader, Nabis, to retake his former territories and regain his influence in Greek affairs.

 Seleucid Empire 
 With his peace agreement with the Egyptians in place, Antiochus III now turns his attention to the West. He is encouraged to challenge Rome's protection of the Greeks by his advisor, the former Carthaginian general Hannibal.
 Philip V of Macedon, along with Rhodes, Pergamum, and the Achaean League, join Rome against Antiochus III.

 Roman Republic 
 The Battle of Mutina is fought near Modena, between the Romans and the Gauls. The Romans are victorious in the battle which effectively ends the threat of the Gauls in Italy.
 The Italian towns of Liternum and Puteoli become Roman colonies.

 China 
 The construction of the first city wall of Chang'an begins.
 Empress Lü protects the accession of her son Emperor Hui by executing Consort Qi and her son to Gaozu, Liu Ruyi.

 Korea 
 The Wiman Joseon kingdom of northern Korea (Choson) is founded by the Chinese Han Dynasty general Wiman.

Births

Deaths 
 Eratosthenes, Greek mathematician, geographer and astronomer (b. 276 BC)
 Concubine Qi, also known as Lady Qi or Consort Qi, favoured concubine of Han Gaozu (personal name Liu Bang), the first emperor of the Chinese Han Dynasty

References